Aleksandar Marinković may refer to:

Aleksandar Marinković (footballer, born 1984), Serbian association football player who plays for FK Kolubara
Aleksandar Marinković (footballer, born 1985), Austrian association football player who plays for WAF Brigittenau
Aleksandar Marinković (footballer, born 1988), Serbian association goalkeeper player who plays for FK Jedinstvo Putevi
Aleksandar Marinković (footballer, born 1990), Serbian association football goalkeeper who plays for FK Zemun